The Cerberus class are four diving support vessels in service with the Dutch Navy. Built by Scheepswerf Visser at Den Helder, their mission is to help the explosive ordnance disposal unit with bomb disposal and to serve as a platform to train new navy divers.

Ships in class

Construction and career

Two of the ships have undergone modifications since being commissioned. In 1997 Hydra received a  extension in the mid-section and a new bow thruster among other things. The lengthening gave here a new displacement of 340 t. Nautilus followed with the same modifications in 2008. As a result, these two ships can carry an additional 2 crew and 22 passengers.

The builder of the new ships will be selected in 2024.
 See Auxiliary ship replacement program for more information.

References

External links

 Cerberus-class at defensie.nl

Auxiliary ships of the Royal Netherlands Navy